Lobedu or Lovedu may refer to:
the Lobedu people
the Lobedu dialect